New India may refer to:

New India (newspaper), an early 20th-century English-language daily newspaper in India
Nava Bharat (New India), a Hindi-language daily newspaper in India
 (New India), a name used on early maps to refer to North America
New India Assurance, an Indian insurance company
New India, an 1885 book by Henry Cotton
The New India, a 1948 book by Atul Chandra Chatterjee